Ioannis Damianos (1861–1920) was a senior Greek Navy officer who fought in the Balkan Wars of 1912–1913.

He was born on 31 January 1861. He served in the Greco-Turkish War of 1897 and in the Balkan Wars of 1912–13 as head of the Ionian Sea squadron and later as head of the cruiser squadron. He also repeatedly held the post of Minister for Naval Affairs.

He retired from service on 20 October 1917 and died on 12 June 1920.

References 

1861 births
1920 deaths
Hellenic Navy admirals
Greek military personnel of the Balkan Wars
Greek military personnel of the Greco-Turkish War (1897)
Ministers of Naval Affairs of Greece